Tez Kharab (also Romanized as Tez Kharāb) is a village in Keshavarz Rural District, Keshavarz District, Shahin Dezh County, West Azerbaijan Province, Iran. At the 2006 census, its population was 775, in 159 families.

References 

Populated places in Shahin Dezh County